Outlaws of Texas is a 1950 American Western film directed by Thomas Carr and written by Daniel B. Ullman. The film stars Whip Wilson, Andy Clyde, Phyllis Coates, Terry Frost, Tommy Farrell and Zon Murray. The film was released on December 10, 1950, by Monogram Pictures.

Plot

Cast          
Whip Wilson as Tom Yeager
Andy Clyde as Hungry Rogers
Phyllis Coates as Annie Moore
Terry Frost as Jordan
Tommy Farrell as Jeff Johnson
Zon Murray as Wilkins
George DeNormand as Bilson
Stephen Carr as Sheriff 
Stanley Price as Bill Moore

References

External links
 

1950 films
American Western (genre) films
1950 Western (genre) films
Monogram Pictures films
Films directed by Thomas Carr
American black-and-white films
1950s English-language films
1950s American films